Charles Robb Robinson (May 18, 1922 – November 9, 2006), was an American politician in the state of Tennessee. Starnes served in the Tennessee House of Representatives as a Democrat from the 51st District from 1970 to 2000.

References

1922 births
2006 deaths
Democratic Party members of the Tennessee House of Representatives
20th-century American politicians